In theoretical physics, the Bogoliubov transformation, also known as the Bogoliubov–Valatin transformation, was independently developed in 1958 by Nikolay Bogolyubov and John George Valatin for finding solutions of BCS theory in a homogeneous system. The Bogoliubov transformation is an isomorphism of either the canonical commutation relation algebra or canonical anticommutation relation algebra. This induces an autoequivalence on the respective representations. The Bogoliubov transformation is often used to diagonalize Hamiltonians, which yields the stationary solutions of the corresponding Schrödinger equation. The Bogoliubov transformation is also important for understanding the Unruh effect, Hawking radiation, pairing effects in nuclear physics, and many other topics.

The Bogoliubov transformation is often used to diagonalize Hamiltonians, with a corresponding transformation of the state function. Operator eigenvalues calculated with the diagonalized Hamiltonian on the transformed state function thus are the same as before.

Single bosonic mode example 

Consider the canonical commutation relation for bosonic creation and annihilation operators in the harmonic basis

Define a new pair of operators

for complex numbers u and v, where the latter is the Hermitian conjugate of the first.

To find the conditions on the constants u and v such that the transformation is canonical, the commutator is evaluated, namely,

It is then evident that  is the condition for which the transformation is canonical.

Since the form of this condition is suggestive of the hyperbolic identity 

the constants  and  can be readily parametrized as

This is interpreted as a linear symplectic transformation of the phase space. By comparing to the Bloch–Messiah decomposition, the two angles  and  correspond to the orthogonal symplectic transformations (i.e., rotations) and the squeezing factor  corresponds to the diagonal transformation.

Applications
The most prominent application is by Nikolai Bogoliubov himself in the context of superfluidity. Other applications comprise Hamiltonians and excitations in the theory of antiferromagnetism. When calculating quantum field theory in curved space–times the definition of the vacuum changes, and a Bogoliubov transformation between these different vacua is possible. This is used in the derivation of Hawking radiation. Bogoliubov transforms are also used extensively in quantum optics, particularly when working with gaussian unitaries (such as beamsplitters, phase shifters, and squeezing operations).

Fermionic mode 

For the anticommutation relations

Therefore, the only non-trivial possibility is  corresponding to particle–antiparticle interchange (or particle–hole interchange in many-body systems) with the possible inclusion of a phase shift. Thus, for a single particle, the transformation can only be implemented (1) for a Dirac fermion, where particle and antiparticle are distinct (as opposed to a Majorana fermion or chiral fermion), or (2) for multi-fermionic systems, in which there is more than one type of fermion.

Applications
The most prominent application is again by Nikolai Bogoliubov himself, this time for the BCS theory of superconductivity. The point where the necessity to perform a Bogoliubov transform becomes obvious is that in mean-field approximation the Hamiltonian of the system can be written in both cases as a sum of bilinear terms in the original creation and destruction operators, involving finite  terms, i.e. one must go beyond the usual Hartree–Fock method. Also in nuclear physics, this method is applicable, since it may describe the "pairing energy" of nucleons in a heavy element.

Multimode example 
The Hilbert space under consideration is equipped with these operators, and henceforth describes a higher-dimensional quantum harmonic oscillator (usually an infinite-dimensional one).

The ground state of the corresponding Hamiltonian is annihilated by all the annihilation operators:

All excited states are obtained as linear combinations of the ground state excited by some creation operators:

One may redefine the creation and the annihilation operators by a linear redefinition:

where the coefficients  must satisfy certain rules to guarantee that the annihilation operators and the creation operators , defined by the Hermitian conjugate equation, have the same commutators 
for bosons and anticommutators for fermions.

The equation above defines the Bogoliubov transformation of the operators.

The ground state annihilated by all  is different from the original ground state , and they can be viewed as the Bogoliubov transformations of one another using the operator–state correspondence. They can also be defined as squeezed coherent states. BCS wave function is an example of squeezed coherent state of fermions.

Unified Matrix description 
Because Bogoliubov transformations are linear recombination of operators, it is more convenient and insightful to write them in terms of matrix transformations. If a pair of annihilators  transform as

where is a  matrix. Then naturally

For Fermion operators, the requirement of commutation relations reflects in two requirements for the form of matrix 

and 

For Boson operators, the commutation relations require

and 

These conditions can be written uniformly as 

where

where  applies to Fermions and Bosons, respectively.

Diagonalizing a quadratic Hamiltonian using matrix description 
Bogoliubov transformation lets us diagonalize a quadratic Hamiltonian

by just diagonalizing the matrix . 
In the notations above, it is important to distinguish the operator  and the numeric matrix .
This fact can be seen by rewriting  as

and  if and only if  diagonalizes , i.e. .

Useful properties of Bogoliubov transformations are listed below.

See also
 Holstein–Primakoff transformation
 Jordan–Wigner transformation
 Jordan–Schwinger transformation
 Klein transformation

References

Further reading
The whole topic, and a lot of definite applications, are treated in the following textbooks:
 
 
 
 

Quantum field theory